Jinja Airport  is a small civilian and military airport in Uganda. It serves the town of Jinja in Jinja District, Busoga, Eastern Region. It is adjacent to the Uganda Senior Command and Staff College of the Uganda People's Defence Force at Kimaka, a suburb of Jinja.

Jinja Airport is one of twelve upcountry airports that are administered by the Uganda Civil Aviation Authority.

See also

 List of airports in Uganda
 Transport in Uganda

References

External links
Uganda Civil Aviation Authority Homepage
OpenStreetMap - Jinja

Airports in Uganda
Jinja District
Jinja, Uganda